Dennis William Streifel (born 8 December 1945) was a business agent and politician in British Columbia. He represented Mission-Kent in the Legislative Assembly of British Columbia from 1991 to 2001 as a New Democratic Party (NDP) member.

He worked for Canada Safeway and Weldwood of Canada before working with the United Food and Commercial Workers, Local 1518. Streifel served in the provincial cabinet as Minister of Fisheries, as Minister of Human Resources, as Minister of Social Services and as Minister of Forests. Streifel did not run for reelection in 2001.

References 

1945 births
Living people
British Columbia New Democratic Party MLAs
Trade unionists from British Columbia
Members of the Executive Council of British Columbia
United Food and Commercial Workers people
20th-century Canadian politicians